Eucithara nevilliana is a small sea snail, a marine gastropod mollusk in the family Mangeliidae.

Distribution

Description

References

 Preston, H. B. "Description of some new species of Cingalese and Indian marine shells." J. Malac 11.4 (1904): 75-78.

External links
  Tucker, J.K. 2004 Catalog of recent and fossil turrids (Mollusca: Gastropoda). Zootaxa 682:1-1295

nevilliana
Gastropods described in 1904